Norfolk Southern Ry. v. James N. Kirby, Pty Ltd., 543 U.S. 14 (2004), was a United States Supreme Court case that dealt with the extent to which maritime bills of lading cover non-maritime portions of a shipment, together with connected clauses for exclusion of liability.

Background 
In August 1997, James N. Kirby, Pty Ltd., an Australian manufacturer, hired International Cargo Control Pty Ltd. (ICC) as a shipping intermediary to arrange a shipment of goods from Milperra, New South Wales to Athens, Alabama. The total shipment consisted of fifty containers, of which forty were routed through the port of Long Beach, California and the rail terminal in Memphis, Tennessee. The remaining ten oversized containers, because of logistical constraints, were routed through the port of Savannah, Georgia. For these ten containers, ICC Ltd. arranged for carriage by truck from Milperra to Sydney, by sea from Sydney to Savannah, by rail from Savannah to Huntsville, Alabama, and by truck from Huntsville to Athens. ICC subcontracted with motor carriers for the truck movements in Australia and Alabama and subcontracted with an ocean carrier for the sea and rail movements.

ICC issued Kirby a bill of lading, which invoked liability limitations provided by the Carriage of Goods by Sea Act (COGSA), as well as a Himalaya clause which extended ICC's limitations of liability to companies ICC hired. ICC hired Hamburg Süd to transport the goods, and Hamburg Süd issued ICC a bill of lading that also invoked COGSA protections and included a Himalaya clause.

The limitation specified in COGSA was:

Hamburg Süd carried the goods on a ship to Savannah, Georgia and subcontracted Norfolk Southern Railway to transport the goods inland to Alabama. In October 1997, the train derailed near Littleville, Alabama. Kirby sued Norfolk Southern in October 1998 to recover the $1.5 million in damages he claimed the derailment caused his goods.

The courts below

The United States District Court for the Northern District of Georgia ruled Norfolk Southern could limit its liability to Kirby on the basis of the Himalaya clause in the Hamburg Süd contract. As the Himalaya clause in the Hamburg Süd bill incorporated COGSA, which specified that liability was limited to $500 per package, and the shipment was packed in ten containers, Norfolk Southern's total liability was therefore $5000. On the joint motion of the parties, the district court certified its order for interlocutory appeal.

The United States Court of Appeals for the Eleventh Circuit reversed and ruled the Hamburg Süd bill did not limit Norfolk Southern's liability to Kirby because Kirby was not bound by its terms. The 11th Circuit observed that previous jurisprudence supported the proposition that Himalaya clauses did not extend to inland carriers that had not been in privity with ICC when ICC issued the bill.:

The issues on appeal

Did federal law govern the interpretation of the ICC and Hamburg Süd bills of lading?
Was Norfolk entitled to the protection of the liability limitations in both bills?

Decision of the Supreme Court

In a unanimous opinion delivered by Justice Sandra Day O'Connor, the Court held that federal law controlled the interpretation of both bills, because they were maritime contracts and the dispute was not inherently local. The Court also held that the 11th Circuit misinterpreted the bills as not protecting Norfolk.

In summary, it was held:

 Federal law governs the interpretation of the ICC and Hamburg Süd bills. 
  When a contract is a maritime one, and the dispute is not inherently local, federal law controls the contract interpretation.
 The bills at issue are maritime contracts. To ascertain a contract's maritime nature, this Court looks not to whether a ship or vessel was involved in the dispute, or to the place of the contract's formation or performance, but to the nature and character of the contract.
 The case is not inherently local, and there is a concern for the uniform meaning of maritime contracts. The same liability limitation in a single bill of lading for international intermodal transportation often applies both to sea and to land, as is true of the Hamburg Süd bill. Likewise, a single Himalaya Clause can cover both sea and land carriers downstream, as in the ICC bill. In protecting the uniformity of federal maritime law, this Court also reinforces the liability regime Congress established in COGSA.
 Norfolk is entitled to the protection of the liability limitations in both bills of lading.
 The ICC bill's broadly written Himalaya Clause limits Norfolk's liability. Because it is clear that a railroad was an intended beneficiary of the ICC bill's broadly written clause, Norfolk's liability is limited by the clause's terms.
 Norfolk also enjoys the benefits of the Hamburg Süd bill's liability limitation. When an intermediary contracts with a carrier to transport goods, the cargo owner's recovery against the carrier is limited by the liability limitation to which the intermediary and carrier agreed.

In Particular, the Court held that the 11th Circuit misinterpreted the Court's previous ruling in Robert C. Herd & Co. v. Krawill Machinery Corp.  Herd simply says that contracts for carriage of goods by sea must be construed like any other contracts: by their terms and consistent with the intent of the parties. If anything, Herd stands for the proposition that there is no special rule for Himalaya Clauses:

Subsequent developments 
In 2010, Kirby was extended to cover domestic rail shipments for which bills of lading had been issued by domestic rail carriers with respect to shipments originating overseas, in the Supreme Court's ruling in Kawasaki Kisen Kaisha Ltd. v. Regal-Beloit Corp. This effectively overruled the Carmack Amendment, which was previously considered to apply in such circumstances.

The Supreme Court rarely takes on appeals in maritime law cases such as Kirby and Regal-Beloit  in fact, there were none in between these two with respect to a through transport situation, so it is advisable to study both of these cases to assess the current position of the Court. It is also a reason to heed the parting words of Justice O’Connor in Kirby:

References

Further reading

External links
 

United States Supreme Court cases
United States Supreme Court cases of the Rehnquist Court
Norfolk Southern Railway
Railway litigation in 2004
2004 in United States case law